Per-Ola Anders Eriksson  (born October 18, 1946) is a Swedish politician. He is a member of the Centre Party. Eriksson was a member of the Parliament of Sweden from 1982 to 1998, and held the key post as chairman of the Committee on Finance from 1991 to 1994, when his party was part of the coalition forming Cabinet of Carl Bildt, which did not have a parliamentary majority on its own. He was director general of Nutek from 1999 to 2002, and became county governor of Norrbotten County in 2003.

Awards
H. M. The King's Medal, 12th size gold medal on Seraphim Order ribbon

References

Members of the Riksdag from the Centre Party (Sweden)
1946 births
Living people
County governors of Sweden
People from Kalix Municipality